Djupvik is a small village on the island of Öland, Sweden. It lies next to the road between Borgholm (15 km) and Byxelkrok. It belongs to the municipality  of Borgholm.

Populated places in Borgholm Municipality